Robo Machines may refer to:
 Robo Machines (comics)
 Robo Machines, a toyline also called Robo Machine

See also
 Machine Robo, a Japanese toyline, the basis of "Robo Machine" and "Robo Machines"